Oriental, Op. 232, No. 2, is a composition by Isaac Albéniz.

It was written for piano, in the key of D minor, as part of the suite Chants d'Espagne.  Since it has been transcribed for classical guitar by Miguel Llobet it has become a notable piece for classical guitar, although not as popular as many of his other pieces. Andrés Segovia also recorded his own version of Oriental in the 1950s and it has also been performed by Stefano Grondona. It was played by the VCU Guitar Ensemble at the VCU Flamenco Festival in 2009.

References

External links
 Oriental, guitar video by Stefano Grondona
 Oriental guitar video by the VCU Guitar Ensemble

Compositions by Isaac Albéniz
Spanish compositions for solo piano
Compositions for guitar